The 2013 National Women's Soccer League season was the inaugural season of the National Women's Soccer League, the top division of women's soccer in the United States. Including the NWSL's two professional predecessors, Women's Professional Soccer (2009–2011) and the Women's United Soccer Association (2001–2003), this was the seventh overall season of FIFA and USSF-sanctioned top division women's soccer in the United States. The league was (and is) operated by the United States Soccer Federation and receives major financial backing from that body. Further financial backing was provided by the Canadian Soccer Association and the Mexican Football Federation. All three national federations paid the league salaries of many of their respective national team members in an effort to nurture talent in those nations.

The league started on April 13 with FC Kansas City hosting Portland Thorns FC. The last regular season matches were played on August 18, followed by postseason playoffs which culminated with a one-game final on August 31. In the final, Portland Thorns FC defeated the Western New York Flash 2–0 to win the inaugural NWSL Championship.

Teams, stadiums, and personnel

Stadiums and locations

Personnel and sponsorship 

Note: All teams used Nike as kit manufacturer.

Player Acquisition 

Players were acquired through the 2013 Allocation of national team players announced on January 11, the 2013 NWSL College Draft on January 18, and the 2013 NWSL Supplemental Draft on February 7, along with free agency, trading and loans.

The Portland Thorns received an allocation with a notably strong offensive record including Alex Morgan and Christine Sinclair, the 2012 U.S. and Canadian Players of the Year and leading scorers for their national teams respectively, as well as a U.S. allocation (Morgan, Tobin Heath, and Rachel Buehler) that accounted for 1/3 of their national team's assists in 2012.

Competition format 

The regular season began on April 13 and ended on August 18. Each team played a total of 22 games: 11 at home and 11 away. Each team played

 three other teams (based on an east/west geographical split) four times each: twice at home and twice away
 two other teams twice each: once at home and once away
 and the remaining two teams three times each: one twice at home and once away, the other vice versa

The four teams at the end of the season with the most points qualified for the playoffs. Two semifinal games were played on August 24, with the winners advancing to the league final to be played on August 31.

Results table 

Scores listed as home-away

League standings

NWSL Championship 

The top four teams from the regular season qualified for the championship playoffs. In the semifinals, the regular season winner hosted the fourth-placed team and the regular season runner-up hosted the third-placed team. The highest-seeded semifinal winner then hosted the championship final. All match-ups were one-game series (as opposed to home-and-away series).

Semi-finals

Championship

Attendance

Average home attendances

Highest Attendance: 17,619 (August 4, Kansas City at Portland)

Lowest Attendance: 688 (May 8, Chicago at Sky Blue)

Total Attendance: 375,846 (88 games total)

League Average: 4,271

Playoff attendance 

Semifinal 1, Portland at FC Kansas City: 4,016

Semifinal 2, Sky Blue at Western New York: 7,316

Championship, Portland at Western New York: 9,129

Statistical leaders

Top scorers 

<small>Source:

Top assists 

Source:

|}

Goalkeeping 

(Minimum of 540 Minutes Played)

Source:

Individual awards

Monthly awards

Weekly awards

Annual awards

Statistics

Scoring 

 First goal of the season: Renae Cuellar for FC Kansas City against Portland Thorns FC, 3rd minute (April 13)
 Earliest goal in a match: 2 minutes
 CoCo Goodson for Sky Blue FC against Washington Spirit (April 27)
 Latest goal in a match: 90+6 minutes
 Lori Chalupny for Chicago Red Stars against FC Kansas City (July 14)
 Widest winning margin: 4 goals
 Sky Blue 5–1 Boston Breakers (June 1)
 Western New York Flash 4–0 Washington Spirit (May 4)
 Most goals scored in a match: 7
 Washington Spirit 2–5 Boston Breakers (July 27)
 Portland Thorns 4-3 FC Kansas City (June 6)
 First Own Goal: McCall Zerboni of Western New York Flash for Sky Blue FC (April 14)
 Average goals per match: 2.705

Hat-tricks

Discipline 

 First yellow card: Kristie Mewis for FC Kansas City against Portland Thorns FC, 43rd minute (April 13)
 Most yellow cards in a match: 6
 Portland Thorns FC 2–1 Seattle Reign FC – 3 for Portland (Allie Long, Angie Kerr, & Nikki Washington) and 3 for Seattle (Elli Reed, Christine Nairn, & Jessica Fishlock) (April 21)

Streaks 

 Longest winning streak: 5 games
 Sky Blue FC, games 5–9
 Longest unbeaten streak: 10 games
 FC Kansas City, games 11–20
 Longest winless streak: 13 games
 Washington Spirit, games 7–19
 Longest losing streak: 9 games
 Seattle Reign FC, games 2–10
 Longest shutout: 435 minutes by Brittany Cameron for Sky Blue FC
 Longest drought: 541 minutes for Washington Spirit

Other firsts 

 First player to score twice in a match: Heather O'Reilly for Boston Breakers against Western New York Flash (April 27)
 First come-from-behind victory: Boston Breakers 2–1 Western New York Flash (April 27)

Home team record 

(Regular season only)

 8 wins, 8 losses, 6 ties – 1.364 PPG
 28 goals for, 26 goals against – +2 GD

See also 

 List of top-division football clubs in CONCACAF countries
 List of professional sports teams in the United States and Canada

References

External links 

 

 
2013
1